Heimir Einarsson (born 20 April 1987) is a retired Icelandic football player who played for Icelandic football club ÍA.

External links

1987 births
Living people
Heimir Einarsson
Heimir Einarsson
Association football defenders